Martin Lane (born 10 October 1985) is a retired flat racing jockey from Ireland. He now lives and works in Fiji.

Career
Lane was born in Kilworth, County Cork. After riding in Ireland, Lane moved to the United Kingdom and rode primarily for Newmarket based trainer David Simcock. In 2010, he secured 41 wins on his way to the British Champion Apprentice title. Notably, taking victory in the John Smith's Cup at York.

It would not be until 2013 that Lane scored another notable big race win, this time with the Tattersalls Millions 2YO Fillies' Trophy at Newmarket, riding Wedding Ring in the colours of Godolphin. In 2014, with Simcock, Lane would team up with Sheikhzayedroad and owned Mohammed Jaber. Scoring notable wins during the 2014 season including the Fred Archer Stakes and York Stakes before heading to Canada and taking victory in the 2014 Grade I Northern Dancer Turf Stakes at Woodbine.

Lane announced his retirement following a meeting at Chelmsford City Racecourse in December 2017. He had just ridden a winner for Godolphin at the track. Following his retirement, Lane moved to Fiji to work in an operations manager role for a resort.

Major wins
 Canada
 Northern Dancer Turf Stakes - Sheikhzayedroad (2014)

References

1985 births
Living people
Irish jockeys
British Champion apprentice jockeys
Lester Award winners
Sportspeople from County Cork
Irish expatriates in Fiji